Treilles-en-Gâtinais (literally "Treilles in Gâtinais") is a commune in the Loiret department in north-central France.

See also
Communes of the Loiret department

References

Treillesengatinais